The Church of the Sacred Hearts of Jesus and Mary was a former Roman Catholic parish church, primarily serving Italian-Americans, that has been demolished. The church was located on 309-315 East 33rd Street, in the Kips Bay area of  Manhattan, New York City. It has since been replaced by a chapel under the same name.

History

Parish church
The parish was established in 1914, to serve an estimated population of 10,000 Italian Americans living in the area. A brick church was built in 1916 for $35,000 to designs by Nicholas Serracino of 1170 Broadway. The first rector was Joseph M. Congedo.

The parish was established in 1914 and construction of the church was begun the following year with the laying of the cornerstone on October 4 by Cardinal John M. Farley, the Archbishop of New York.  The completed church was dedicated on October 1, 1916, by Archbishop Giovanni Bonzano, P.I.M.E., Apostolic Delegate to the United States at the time. There were a few little changes later with the replacement of the original oak doors with cruciform windows with black metal doors with square windows.

The parish operated a school with the same name from 1925 through 1937. The parish also operated Immaculata High School, which was run by the Sisters, Servants of the Immaculate Heart of Mary. The high school was closed in the 1970s.

The parish was closed in January 2007, one of several closed that year by the then-archbishop,  Cardinal Edward Egan. It was then merged with the Church of Our Lady of the Scapular–St. Stephen and the church and school were demolished. In November 2014, it was announced by the archdiocese that the existing parish was to be merged into Our Saviour Parish as of the following year.

Chapel
After the demolition of the parish church, a small chapel and residence for the clergy, also dedicated to the Sacred Hearts of Jesus and Mary, was built on the site, 325 East 33rd Street, with "A.D. 2009" prominently carved into the cornerstone of the building. The first Mass was celebrated on May 18, 2009. It served as the residence of the same Cardinal Egan who ordered the closing of the parish, after his retirement as archbishop, until his death in 2015. He himself dedicated the chapel in May 2010.

Clergy 
These include

Former pastors:
Right Rev. Msgr. Joseph Congedo (1914-1954)
Rev. John McEvoy (1954-1962)
Right Rev. Msgr. Thomas A. Dunn (1962-1971)
Rev. Msgr. William Rinschler (1971-1985)
Rev. Msgr. Albert DeLuca (1985-2006)
Rev. Msgr. Donald Sakano (2006-2007)
Rev. Msgr. Lawrence Connaughton (2007-2009)

Administrators of the chapel:
Rev. Msgr. Lawrence Connaughton (2009–2012)
Rev. Robert J. Robbins (2012-2021)
Msgr. Kevin Sullivan (since September 2019)

References 

Roman Catholic churches in Manhattan
Neoclassical architecture in New York City
Greek Revival architecture in New York City
Greek Revival church buildings in New York City
Closed churches in the Roman Catholic Archdiocese of New York
Closed churches in New York City
Demolished churches in New York City
Demolished buildings and structures in Manhattan
Italian-American culture in New York City
Roman Catholic churches completed in 1916
Kips Bay, Manhattan
1914 establishments in New York City
2009 establishments in New York City
2007 disestablishments in New York (state)
Buildings and structures demolished in 2008
21st-century Roman Catholic church buildings in the United States
Roman Catholic churches completed in 2009
20th-century Roman Catholic church buildings in the United States
Neoclassical church buildings in the United States